Carlos Alberto Gomes da Silva Filho (born 14 April 2002), known as Carlos Alberto, is a Brazilian professional footballer who plays as a winger for Botafogo, on loan from América Mineiro .

Club career 
Carlos Alberto made his professional debut for América Mineiro on the 18 February 2020, coming on as a substitute against Coimbra in a Campeonato Mineiro 2–0 away win.

International career 
Carlos Alberto was selected by André Jardine with Brazil under-20 in Octobre 2020 for a quadrangular tournament. He played 3 games in December, against Bolivia, Peru and Chile, eventually winning the tournament.

References

External links

2002 births
Living people
People from João Pessoa, Paraíba
Brazilian footballers
Association football forwards
Campeonato Brasileiro Série A players
Campeonato Brasileiro Série B players
América Futebol Clube (MG) players
Botafogo de Futebol e Regatas players
Brazil youth international footballers
Sportspeople from Paraíba